James Dees (1845 – 1911) was an English cricketer. He played in two first-class matches in New Zealand for Wellington in 1873/74.

See also
 List of Wellington representative cricketers

References

External links
 

1845 births
1911 deaths
English cricketers
Wellington cricketers
People from Bedlington
Cricketers from Northumberland